PSR J0540−6919 (PSR B0540−69) is a pulsar in the Tarantula Nebula of the Large Magellanic Cloud. It is the first extragalactic gamma-ray pulsar discovered.

History
This Crab-like pulsar was first discovered in X-rays in 1984 and subsequently detected at radio wavelengths. Astronomers initially attributed the glow to collisions of subatomic particles accelerated in the shock waves produced by supernova explosions, and it took more than six years of observations by Fermi's Large Area Telescope to detect gamma-ray pulsations from J0540-6919.

In 2015, it was determined that J0540-6919 is responsible for about half of the gamma-ray flux from the Tarantula Nebula in the Large Magellanic Cloud. It was identified as a bright source of gamma radiation early in the Fermi mission.

See also
Gamma-ray burst

References

Stars in the Large Magellanic Cloud
Pulsars
Extragalactic stars
Tarantula Nebula